Eliot Shapleigh (born November 11, 1952) is an American politician. He served in the Texas Senate from 1997 to 2011, from the 29th district, which is in El Paso County.

Community involvement

Unite El Paso
In 1992, Shapleigh co-founded an organization called Unite El Paso with other progressive activists. The organization seeks to raise the per capita income in El Paso.

Texas Senate career

Legislative record
In 2006, Shapleigh authored "Jennifer's Law", a law that permits school districts to award posthumous diplomas to students who die during their senior year of high school. The bill was named after Jennifer Ann Crecente.

El Paso Economic Summit
Soon thereafter, Shapleigh, County Attorney José Rodriguez, Woody Hunt, Robert Brown, John Montford, and others joined in discussions about how best to establish the medical school and which institution should carry the mission forward. As a result, the Texas Tech University System Board of Regents made establishing a four-year medical school in El Paso an important goal of the System. Over the coming legislative sessions, incremental progress was made in establishing the state's ninth medical school and first since 1977. In 2009, the first new medical students at El Paso's medical school began their studies at the campus. The El Paso Medical School was the first new medical school to be established in the U.S. in 30 years.

ASARCO
Shapleigh led the opposition to the reopening of an ASARCO-operated copper smelter, which had been located near downtown El Paso since 1887. The smelter, which had been shut down in 1999 due to low copper prices, filed to renew their air permit application with the Texas Commission on Environmental Quality in 2002. Joined by leaders from across the three-state, two-nation region, Shapleigh and hundreds of activists from El Paso, Juarez, and New Mexico placed pressure on the corporation to justify putting over 7,000 tons of new pollutants into El Paso's air. After eight years, the TCEQ Commissioners granted the permit on a 3-0 vote. The Environmental Protection Agency soon intervened, however, citing deficiencies with the permitting process and ASARCO's air control equipment. As a result, ASARCO announced that the El Paso smelter would not reopen. As of July 2009, it appears the smelter property will be placed in an environmental remediation trust so that it may be cleaned up using funding obtained via ASARCO's bankruptcy.

Political future
Shapleigh announced on October 16, 2009, that he would not run for re-election in 2010. When asked if he will run for another office, he indicated that he is undecided, though suggested he would not run for Congress. State Senator Juan Hinojosa suggested that Shapleigh might run for governor.

Election history
Election history of District 29 from 1992.

Most recent election

2006

Previous elections

2002

2000

1996

Notes

External links

Project Vote Smart - Senator Eliot Shapleigh (TX) profile
Follow the Money - Eliot Shapleigh
2006 2004 2002 2000 campaign contributions

1952 births
Living people
Texas state senators
Rice University alumni
People from El Paso, Texas
University of Texas School of Law alumni
Peace Corps volunteers
21st-century American politicians